Stara Ushytsia is an urban-type settlement in Kamianets-Podilskyi Raion (district) of Khmelnytskyi Oblast in western Ukraine. Stara Ushytsia hosts the administration of Stara Ushytsia settlement hromada, one of the hromadas of Ukraine. The settlement's population was 2,492 as of the 2001 Ukrainian Census and

Geography
The town is situated on the banks of the Dnister River in the Podolian landscape. It  is located near the National Environmental Park "Podilski Tovtry".

History
The settlement was first mentioned in written documents in 1144 as Ushytsia. Ushytsia was also granted the Magdeburg rights in 1144. In 1826, the settlement was renamed to "Stara Ushytsia" (Old Ushytsia) while the settlement of Litnivtsi was renamed Nova Ushytsia (New Ushytsia).

It was granted the status of an urban-type settlement in 1979. The town houses the Stara Ushytisa Settlement Council, which was founded in 1982. The council administers the town of Stara Ushytsia itself and the village of Horaivka.

See also
 Bakota, Ukraine, a former settlement near the town that houses an ancient cave monastery

References

External links
 

Urban-type settlements in Kamianets-Podilskyi Raion
Populated places on the Dniester River in Ukraine
Populated places established in the 12th century
Ushitsky Uyezd
Kamianets-Podilskyi Raion